Carabus hummelii is a species of ground beetle in the family Carabidae. It is found in China, North Korea, Russia, and Mongolia.

Subspecies
These 14 subspecies belong to the species Carabus hummelii:
 Carabus hummelii bonoi Obydov, 2006  (Russia)
 Carabus hummelii chrysothorax Kraatz, 1886  (China, North Korea, and Russia)
 Carabus hummelii gaolinensis Obydov, 2008  (China)
 Carabus hummelii hummelii Fischer von Waldheim, 1823  (China, Mongolia, and Russia)
 Carabus hummelii jurgae Obydov, 1995  (Russia)
 Carabus hummelii middendorfi Ménétriés, 1851  (Russia)
 Carabus hummelii nevelskii Shilenkov, 1996  (Russia)
 Carabus hummelii pusongensis Imura, 1993  (China, North Korea, and Russia)
 Carabus hummelii putyatini Rapuzzi, 2012  (Russia)
 Carabus hummelii stolidus Lapouge, 1925  (Russia)
 Carabus hummelii suensoni Mandl, 1979  (China)
 Carabus hummelii tongnimensis Deuve & Li, 2008  (North Korea)
 Carabus hummelii tristiculus Kraatz, 1878  (Russia)
 Carabus hummelii zubatschiki Obydov & Saldaitis, 2008  (China)

References

Carabus
Beetles described in 1823
Beetles of Asia